Warburton also known as Mandi Warburton is a large town situated in Nankana Sahib District in the Punjab province of Pakistan.

The city was named by or after John Paul Warburton (1840–1919), a high-ranking police officer of the Raj period. The Warburton's were a prominent Anglo-Indian family, but John Paul was adopted, originally being called Jan Dad Khan. His residence at that time was turned into a high school which is still functional. This area is surrounded by industries. There is a police station, a post office and a girl's college. The main businesses in Warburton are related to agriculture as the town is situated in an agricultural region, notably rice - the Narag Rice mills owned by Haji Sheikh Nazir Ahmad and his sons are at the heart of this city. Several banks that flow through the city aid the farmers.

Before establishment of Nankana Sahib as a district the town was a part of Sheikhupura district. The town falls under constituency NA-117 (Nankana Sahib-Ι) of the National Assembly of Pakistan.

The city of Warburton is home to notable personalities including Haji Hakim Ali Gujjar Numberdar, DR Ghafaar, Additional I.G Rana Fateh Shair Joyia , Athar, M Yousaf, Bilal Ahmad,  and many more. 

Warburton has a grand market where people from nearby villages come and shop. It also has a lot to offer when it comes to food with a large number of traditional food restaurants. People here live in harmony and with a passion for sports.

Before Partition of India in 1947 the town was also home to several Sikh families the remains of which can still be seen today. Today, Sheikhs are in majority. 

Popular attractions include the Sapphire factory, the scenic Police Station of Warburton, the Warburton High School - previously mansion to John Paul Warburton, the houses of Chariman Sheikh Jamil Ahmad Narag M Yousaf Raza 
and Rana Omer Hayat’s famous gold shop.

References

Populated places in Nankana Sahib District